The Shah Alam Expressway  is a  controlled-access highway in Peninsular Malaysia running between Pandamaran in Klang, Selangor to Sri Petaling in Kuala Lumpur. Shah Alam Expressway is the third east–west-oriented expressway in the Klang Valley after the Federal Highway and New Klang Valley Expressway. This expressway is part of the Kuala Lumpur Middle Ring Road 2 Scheme (Sunway Interchange–Sri Petaling Interchange).

Overview
The Shah Alam Expressway is an alternative to the congested Federal Highway, and a motorist on the expressway can practically travel to any part of the Klang Valley as it connects to a wide range of highway networks such as the Damansara–Puchong Expressway, North–South Expressway Central Link, North–South Expressway, Maju Expressway, New Klang Valley Expressway, Kemuning–Shah Alam Highway and the Kuala Lumpur–Karak Expressway.

Given its high accessibility in connectivity, the Shah Alam Expressway is a popular travelling mode and over one million motorists ply the route on a daily basis, of which 66% are using the toll-free stretch.

The Shah Alam Expressway starts at kilometre 18 near Pandamaran Interchange in Klang, Selangor.

History

Konsortium Expressway Shah Alam Selangor
The Konsortium Expressway Shah Alam Selangor Sdn Bhd (KESAS) is a join consortium between Selangor State Development Corporation (PKNS), Gamuda Berhad, Arab Malaysian Development Berhad (AMDB) and Permodalan Nasional Berhad (PNB). The company was formed on 3 September 1993 to finance, design, construct, operate, maintain and collect toll for the Shah Alam Expressway for 28 years and 9 months.

Construction
Construction of the expressway began on 1994. Phase 1 (Seafield–Sri Petaling) was completed in 1996 and Phase 2 (Seafield–Pandamaran) was completed in 1998. During the 1998 Commonwealth Games in Kuala Lumpur, the expressway became a gateway to National Sports Complex in Bukit Jalil.

The expressway formerly featured its own electronic toll collection system, known as the "Express TAG". From 1 July 2004, the Express TAG was replaced by the Touch 'n Go and SmartTAG systems.

Tolls
The Shah Alam Expressway using opened toll systems.

Electronic Toll Collections (ETC)
As part of an initiative to facilitate faster transaction at the Kemuning, Sunway, Awan Besar and Awan Kecil Toll Plazas, all toll transactions at four toll plazas on the Shah Alam Expressway will be conducted electronically via Touch 'n Go cards or SmartTAGs starting 2 March 2016.

Toll rates
(Starting 15 January 2013)

List of interchanges, laybys and rest and service areas

Below is a list of interchanges (exits), laybys and rest and service areas along the Shah Alam Expressway. The exits are arranged in ascending numerical order from West to East.

External links
 Gamuda Group
 KESAS

See also
 Malaysian expressway system

1996 establishments in Malaysia
Expressways in Malaysia
Expressways and highways in the Klang Valley